Jose Charles (born 19 August 1993) is a Mexican professional boxer.

Professional career
On April 2, 2011 Charles knocked out the veteran Juan Hernandez at the Arena JUBA in Reynosa, Tamaulipas, Mexico.

References

External links

Boxers from Tamaulipas
People from Reynosa
Light-middleweight boxers
1983 births
Living people
Mexican male boxers